Nikoloz "Nika" Gvaramia (born June 29, 1976) is a Georgian lawyer, politician, television host and businessman who had held posts of Minister of Justice and Minister of Education and Science. He was Director General of Rustavi 2 and Mtavari Arkhi.

Early life
Gvaramia was born on June 29, 1976 in Sukhumi, Abkhaz ASSR, Georgian SSR. He graduated from the Law Department of Tbilisi State University in 1998 and completed his post graduate studies in 2001. From 2002 through 2003, he practised law at "Sando Law Firm". In 2004, he worked as a lawyer at Telasi company.

Political career
During 2003 elections, Gvaramia was elected to the Georgian Parliament as the leader of Saakashvili's United National Movement, serving as an MP from 2004 through 2007. He was then appointed First Deputy Prosecutor General of Georgia in March 2007. On January 24, 2008 Gvaramia was nominated and on January 31, appointed Minister of Justice. He served as the Minister of Justice until October 27, 2008. He was then appointed Minister of Science and Education, the position he quit on December 7, 2009. He was replaced by Dimitry Shashkin. As announced by the Prime Minister, the reason for quitting the government position was due to Gvaramia's plans to continue his education abroad. On 19 December 2012, the investigations department of the Ministry of Finance of Georgia announced that Nika Gvaramia was arrested due to alleged corruption. But, he was released soon after due to lack of proof.

On the 16th of May, 2022 Gvaramia was sentenced to 3.5 years in prison on charges of abuse of power and embezzlement while serving as director of another broadcaster, he was also ordered to pay a fine of 50,000 Lari (US$16,670). The conviction was upheld by the Tbilisi Court of Appeals in November 2022.

Personal life

Gvaramia is married and has three children.

See also
 Cabinet of Georgia

References

1976 births
Living people
People from Sukhumi
Mingrelians
United National Movement (Georgia) politicians
Government ministers of Georgia (country)
Members of the Parliament of Georgia
Jurists from Georgia (country)
Tbilisi State University alumni
Recipients of the Presidential Order of Excellence